Unorganized Yukon, or Yukon, Unorganized, is the unorganized area covering the majority of Yukon, Canada. It represents 98% of Yukon's  land mass, and is recognized as a census subdivision by Statistics Canada.

Demographics 

Communities

See also 

 List of communities in Yukon
 Unorganized Borough, Alaska, a similar area in the neighbouring US state of Alaska

References 

Geography of Yukon